Corymbia leptoloma, commonly known as the yellowjacket or Paluma Range yellowjacket, is a species of tree that is endemic to Queensland. It has rough, tessellated bark on the trunk and branches, lance-shaped or curved adult leaves, flower buds in groups of seven and barrel-shaped, urn-shaped or shortened spherical fruit.

Description
It has thick, rough, grey-yellow, tessellated to flaky bark on the trunk and branches.

Corymbia leichhardtii sometimes occurs in the same vicinity and can be distinguished from C. leptoloma by its dull leaves that are a similar colour on both sides.

Taxonomy and naming
Yellowjacket was first formally described in 1991 by Ian Brooker and Anthony Bean in the journal Austrobaileya, and was given the name Eucalyptus leptoloma from specimens Brooker collected near Paluma in 1989. In 1995, Ken Hill and Lawrie Johnson changed the name to Corymbia leptoloma.

Distribution and habitat
Corymbia leptoloma is only known from a small area north west of Townsville where it is found in remnant areas of wet sclerophyll forest in association with Syncarpia glomulifera, Eucalyptus resinifera and Corymbia intermedia in gullies or on hillsides. It grows in coarse sandy soils derived from granite.

Conservation status
This eucalypt is classified as "vulnerable" under the Australian Government Environment Protection and Biodiversity Conservation Act 1999 and the Queensland Government Nature Conservation Act 1992. The main threats to the species are habitat destruction and disturbance due to agriculture, mining and timber harvesting.

See also
 List of Corymbia species

References

leptoloma
Myrtales of Australia
Flora of Queensland
Plants described in 1991